The Oakland Oaks were a minor league baseball team in Oakland, California that played in the Pacific Coast League from 1903 through 1955, after which the club transferred to Vancouver, British Columbia. The team was named for the city and used the oak tree and the acorn as its symbols.

Team history
Along with the Los Angeles Angels, Portland Beavers, Sacramento Solons, San Francisco Seals, and Seattle Indians, the Oaks were charter members of the Pacific Coast League which was founded in 1903.

In their first year of competition, 1903, the team finished last, and finished either last or next to last place four more times before winning its first PCL pennant in 1912. The Oaks (or "Acorns" as they were also called) played their home games at Freeman's Park at 59th Street and San Pablo Avenue and at Recreation Park in San Francisco.

After the 1912 season, the Oaks opened their new stadium, named Oakland Ball Park (or simply Oaks Park) though it was located in the neighboring city of Emeryville at San Pablo and Park Avenues. In their first season at Oaks Park the Acorns finished last, and were mired in the second division for more than a decade.

In 1916, a struggling Oaks team made history by (inadvertently) breaking the professional baseball color line, as Jimmy Claxton pitched in both ends of a double-header on May 28, 1916. He was introduced to the team as an American Indian, but once the team discovered that his ancestry was both Native American and African, he was fired.
The Oaks were owned by PCL founding father J. Cal Ewing from 1903 until the 1920s. Ewing also owned the San Francisco Seals, which allowed the clubs to share their ballparks at various times with no problem, but the leaders of Organized Baseball eventually made Ewing choose one or the other, and he divested his interests in the Oakland club.

In 1927, the Oaks won their first pennant at Oaks Park, finishing 120–75 (.615),  games over the runner-up Seals.

In 1943, a controlling interest in the Oaks was purchased by C. L. "Brick" Laws, who operated the team for its remaining seasons. In 1946, Laws hired Casey Stengel, the former manager of the Brooklyn Dodgers and Boston Braves of the National League, to manage the Oaks. He responded with second and fourth-place finishes, before the club won its most celebrated pennant in 1948. It was in Oakland that Stengel developed his talent for platooning, which later served him as manager of the New York Yankees.

The 1948 Oaks were nicknamed the "Nine Old Men" in that many of the star players were older veterans, including Ernie Lombardi, Billy Raimondi, Cookie Lavagetto, Nick Etten and Catfish Metkovich. There were younger players on the team as well, including rookie second baseman Billy Martin. Rooming with Martin and playing shortstop was Artie Wilson, the first black player on the Oaks since Jimmy Claxton was fired. Wilson won the PCL batting title with a .348 average and also led in stolen bases with 47. In 1950, he led the PCL in runs with 168 and hits with 264, helping the Oaks to the 1950 PCL championship.

Stengel's success with the Oaks did not go unnoticed, and he became manager of the Yankees in 1949. Stengel was replaced by Chuck Dressen, who led the Oaks to a second-place finish in 1949 and the PCL pennant in 1950. Again, the Oaks' manager's success resulted in a promotion to the major leagues, with Dressen hired to manage the Dodgers in 1951. Former New York Giants star Mel Ott was hired as his replacement. Ott led the Oaks to an 80–88 record in 1951 (seventh place) and a 104–76 mark in 1952 (second place).

Augie Galan replaced Ott as the Oaks' skipper in 1953, and the team stumbled to a 77–103 record and seventh place in the PCL.

After three seasons in charge of the Dodgers in Brooklyn, Chuck Dressen returned as Oaks manager in 1954. The Acorns finished third with an 85–82 record under Dressen, but won the postseason series to capture their last PCL pennant. In spite of this, attendance at the now-dilapidated Oaks Park had dropped dramatically.

Dressen returned to managing at the major-league level in 1955, taking over in the Washington Senators' dugout, making way for San Francisco Seals legend Lefty O'Doul in Oakland. Under O'Doul, the Oaks finished seventh (77–95) in 1955, and their attendance was the worst of the eight-team league. Owner Laws felt he had no other choice but to move the team. When officials of Vancouver, British Columbia made him an offer, Laws moved the Oaks to Vancouver, where they were renamed the Vancouver Mounties.

Oaks Park was demolished in 1957, replaced by a Pepsi-Cola bottling plant. Presently, the site is the headquarters of Pixar Animation Studios. The only thing left in the area to suggest that baseball was ever played at Park and San Pablo Avenues is a cardroom and restaurant across the street, appropriately named the Oaks Club. There is also a plaque commemorating Stengel and the Oaks on 59th.

On October 18, 1967, twelve years after the Oaks played their last game in Emeryville, the American League owners gave Kansas City Athletics president Charles O. Finley permission to move the Athletics to Oakland for the 1968 season.

Notable Oaks players with MLB experience

Buzz Arlett
George Bamberger
Charlie Beamon
Gene Bearden
 Sam Bohne (originally "Sam Cohen")
Roger Bowman
Ernie Broglio
Sam Chapman
Bill Conroy
Vince DiMaggio
Chuck Dressen
Augie Galan
Billy Herman (HOF)
Jackie Jensen
Spider Jorgensen
Harry Krause
Ray Kremer
Cookie Lavagetto
Thornton Lee
Ernie Lombardi (HOF)
Billy Martin
Hersh Martin
Catfish Metkovich
Joe Gordon (HOF) 
Johnny Ostrowski
Mel Ott (HOF)
Jackie Price
Earl Rapp
Jimmie Reese
Bill Rigney
Neill Sheridan
Floyd Speer
Casey Stengel (HOF)
Jim Tobin
Artie Wilson
Chuck Workman
Roy Zimmerman

Affiliations
The Oaks were independent of farm systems for most of their existence; they were affiliated with the following major league teams:

Tributes

The Oakland Athletics have worn Oaks uniforms on occasion in a "1950s throwback night" promotion.

References
Notes

Sources

O'Neal, Bill. The Pacific Coast League 1903–1988. Eakin Press, Austin TX, 1990. .
Snelling, Dennis. The Pacific Coast League: A Statistical History, 1903–1957 McFarland & Company, Inc., Jefferson, North Carolina, 1995. .

External links

Oakland Oaks Web Site

Baseball teams established in 1903
Baseball teams disestablished in 1955
Defunct Pacific Coast League teams
Sports teams in Oakland, California
Defunct baseball teams in California